Wirya Salih, known as Abu Abdullah al Shafi'i (Father of Abdullah, the Shafi'i), is the former leader of Jamaat Ansar al-Sunna and Ansar al-Islam from early 2003 to 2010. He is a Kurdish veteran of jihad in Afghanistan and Chechnya. On 3 May 2010, he was captured along with seven others and is being held in Baghdad Central Prison.

References

Year of birth missing (living people)
Living people
Iraqi Salafis
Prisoners and detainees of Iraq